The French embassy in Pretoria is the main diplomatic mission of France in South Africa. The embassy is located at 250 Melk Street in the South African administrative capital city of Pretoria. , the Ambassador-Designate is Aurélien Lechevallier.

References

External links
Official website

Pretoria
France
France–South Africa relations